The 2014 NASCAR Whelen Modified Tour is the 30th season of the Whelen Modified Tour (WMT). It began with the UNOH Battle at the Beach at Daytona International Speedway on February 18, which did not count towards the championship. The first race for the championship was the Icebreaker 150 presented by Town Fair Tire at Thompson Speedway Motorsports Park on April 6. It ended with the Sunoco World Series 150 at Thompson again on October 19. Ryan Preece entered the season as the defending Drivers' Champion. 2012 champion Doug Coby won the 2014 championship after 13 races, 22 points ahead of Preece. Preece won the last race, which meant he went from sixth to second in the championship.

Drivers

Notes

Schedule

The UNOH Battle at the Beach and the Whelen All-Star Shootout did not count towards the championship.

Notes

The Riverhead 200 was originally scheduled to be held at Riverhead Raceway on September 13, but the event was rained out. With the track unable to hold racing after September due to licensing regulations and the lack of an available weekend to hold racing, the event was not rescheduled.

Results and standings

Races

Notes
1 – There was no qualifying session for the Whelen All-Star Shootout. The starting grid was decided with a random draw.
2 – Ryan Newman and Ron Silk both led 16 laps.

Drivers' championship

(key) Bold - Pole position awarded by time. Italics - Pole position set by final practice results or rainout. * – Most laps led.

Notes
‡ – Non-championship round
1 – Dave Salzarulo, Gary McDonald, Richie Pallai Jr. and Cole Powell received championship points, despite the fact that the driver did not qualify for the race.
2 – Scored points towards the Whelen Southern Modified Tour.

See also

2014 NASCAR Sprint Cup Series
2014 NASCAR Nationwide Series
2014 NASCAR Camping World Truck Series
2014 NASCAR K&N Pro Series East
2014 NASCAR K&N Pro Series West
2014 NASCAR Whelen Southern Modified Tour
2014 NASCAR Canadian Tire Series
2014 NASCAR Toyota Series
2014 NASCAR Whelen Euro Series

References